Alan Sanchez may refer to:
 Alan Sanchez (soccer) (1988–2020), American soccer player
 Alan Sanchez (boxer) (born 1991), Mexican boxer